The Kruger to Canyons Biosphere Region is a biosphere reserve situated in the north eastern region of South Africa, straddling Limpopo and Mpumalanga Provinces. In 2001, under the supervision of the then Department of Environmental Affairs (DEA), the Kruger to Canyons Biosphere Region (K2C BR) was officially ratified by UNESCO as part of the Man and the Biosphere (MaB) Programme. UNESCO's Man and the Biosphere Programme provides a framework for exploring local solutions to challenges by mainstreaming biodiversity conservation and sustainable development, integrating economic, social and environmental aspects and recognizing their vital linkages within specific learning landscapes adjacent to Protected Areas (as core areas).

Location
{
  "type": "FeatureCollection",
  "features": [
    {
      "type": "Feature",
      "properties": {},
      "geometry": {
        "type": "Polygon",
        "coordinates": [
          [
            [
              30.673828125000004,
              -24.607069137709694
            ],
            [
              30.673828125000004,
              -23.71495350699027
            ],
            [
              31.986694335937504,
              -23.71495350699027
            ],
            [
              31.986694335937504,
              -24.607069137709694
            ],
            [
              30.673828125000004,
              -24.607069137709694
            ]
          ]
        ]
      }
    }
  ]
}The K2C BR is situated in the North Eastern section of South Africa and includes two of South Africa’s key tourism sites – the Kruger National Park and the Blyde River Canyon, as well as one of the leading international floral hotspots, the Wolkberg Region.  The current boundaries of the registered Biosphere extend from the Letaba River in the North to the Sabie River in the South and the Blyde Escarpment in the West to the Mozambique border in the East.

Size
This give a total of 2,608,000 ha  of which the core zone is 923,000 ha, the buffer zone 485,000 ha and the Transition Zone is 1,200,000 ha. Within this region, there are approximately 1,155 permanent residents in the core zones, 10,475 in the buffer zones and 1,488,684 in the transition zones. This extensive geographical area, together with the large number of residents within the region, all adds up to a very active and a very diverse area.

Biosphere Functions 
The strategic plan of the K2C needs to be seen within the framework of the MaB Strategy and Lima Action Plan where every Biosphere globally is intended to fulfil three basic functions, which are complementary and mutually reinforcing.  These three core functions are the following:

 Conservation: Conserving genetic resources and ecosystems and maintaining biodiversity;
 Sustainable Development: Foster economic and human development which is socio-culturally and ecologically sustainable;
 Logistics: An international network of areas related to MaB field research and monitoring accompanied by education and training.

Central to fulfilling these three basic functions is the zonation of biospheres that spatially and conceptually delineates the following zones that are bound by and guided by national and provincial legislation as well as district and local municipal by- laws:

 Core Zone: Legally constituted and dedicated to long-term protection
 Buffer Zone: clearly identified and surrounding or contiguous to the core
 Transition Zone: where sustainable resource management practices are promoted).

Building on the above the K2C has three strategic objectives (SO) that align with the Man and Biosphere strategy:

 SO 1: To enhance the conservation of biodiversity and cultural heritage, maintain ecosystem services and foster the sustainable and equitable use of natural resources through the implementation of projects.
 SO 2: To explore, develop, support, and study thriving sustainable societies, economies, and human settlements respecting the web of life on which they depend.
 SO 3: To promote the understanding of the impact of environmental changes, including climate change, and develop and support mitigation and adaptation actions.

Kruger to Canyons Biosphere Region Non-Profit Company 
The Kruger to Canyons Biosphere Region Non-Profit Company (K2C NPC) was established in 2011 to act as the vehicle for coordinating the implementation of Biosphere activities. The Founding Board of 2011-2013 put the first enabling mechanisms in place and today a strategic plan has been developed and is implemented within the framework of the K2C NPC internal policies and the South African Companies Act. The K2C NPC has built and developed a contingent of capable staff over the years governed by a Board of Non-Executive Directors.  The K2C functions on a project-based annual budget that has been approved and is tracked by the K2C BR NPC Board’s Risk and Audit Committee.

The K2C NPC's vision is “Partnering to achieve a sustainable future for all life in the K2C biosphere” and the K2C NPC works towards this vision and partnerships through relevant facilitation, collaboration, co-ordination and fundraising to either support or initiate and implement actions.

The K2C NPC is currently running 11 projects with partners across this landscape linking sustainable development and biodiversity conservation. Project focuses vary from the expansion of protected areas; other effective area-based conservation measures (OECMs); capacity building of environmental monitors in rural communities; environmental awareness; water security; alien invasive plant clearing, agro-ecology and sustainable land management. Interventions are focused on the interface where vulnerable communities; water; biodiversity and ecosystem services exists which is pertinent in the face of climate change. This is achieved by working at a number of levels, across disciplines and with a number of partners which helps to ensure impact at scale. In addition work focuses on capacity building, awareness and career pathing activities within the environmental sector with a particular focus on youth and women. Since the inception of the K2C  NPC in 2011, over 23 projects have been successfully implemented by the biosphere which is a highly embedded NGO within the Limpopo and Mpumalanga landscape.

Achievements 

Accomplishments to date include: 74 010 hectares declared as protected areas; 958 jobs created in the green economy; currently 170 Environmental Monitors in communities and partner supporting host institutions; 14 199 hectares of land has been rehabilitated and 22 167 hectares cleared of alien invasive plants.

Funders and Partners 
Limpopo Department: Economic Development, Environment and Tourism; MTPA; DEFF; Conservation South Africa; AWARD; Hoedspruit Hub; SANParks; Flanders; SANBI; Global Environment Facility; WWF; SAFCOL; Maruleng Municipality; SAEON; US AID; BirdLife South Africa; UNDP; South African Wildlife College.

References

External links

 Our Sand Video
 Our Rhino Video
 www.kruger2canyons.org
 Man and Biosphere Programme
 Biodiversity-day.info: Kruger to Canyons Biosphere

Biosphere reserves of South Africa